Che! is a 1969 American biographical film directed by Richard Fleischer and starring Omar Sharif as Marxist revolutionary Ernesto "Che" Guevara. It follows Guevara from when he first landed in Cuba in 1956 to his death in Bolivia in 1967, although the film does not portray the formative pre-Cuban revolution sections of Che's life as described in the autobiographical book The Motorcycle Diaries (1993).

Plot
The film tells of Che Guevara (Omar Sharif), a young Argentine doctor who proves his mettle during the Cuban guerrilla war in the late 1950s. He gains the respect of his men and becomes the leader of a patrol.

Fidel Castro (Jack Palance) is impressed by Guevara's tactics and discipline and makes him his chief adviser. When Castro defeats Cuban dictator Batista after two years of fighting, Guevara directs a series of massive reprisals, yet, Guevara dreams of fomenting a worldwide revolution. After Castro backs down during the Cuban Missile Crisis, Guevara accuses Castro of being a Soviet tool and decides to leave Cuba.

Guevara lands in Bolivia, where he attempts to begin his dream of a worldwide peasant revolution, but the Bolivian peasants do not follow his lead and the Bolivian Army pursues him.

Cast
 Omar Sharif as Che Guevara
 Jack Palance as Fidel Castro
 Cesare Danova as Ramon Valdez
 Robert Loggia as Faustino Morales
 Woody Strode as Guillermo
 Barbara Luna as Anita Marquez
 Frank Silvera as Goatherd
 Albert Paulsen as Captain Vasquez
 Linda Marsh as Tania
 Tom Troupe as Felipe Muñoz
 Rudy Diaz as Willy
 Perry Lopez as Rolando
 Abraham Sofaer as Pablo Rojas
 Richard Angarola as Colonel Salazar
 Sarita Vara as Celia Sanchez
 Gil Serna as Lt. Suarez
 Paul Bertoya as Raúl Castro

Production
The film was directed by Richard Fleischer who said before filming:
An enormous amount of pressure has been brought to bear on this film – both for and against the subject. Each group is afraid we're going to favor the other. The picture will be a character study, and I will only say that it is neither pro nor anti Guevera. The printing of his diary caused only minor changes to the picture... I consider our sources for information impeccable and I cannot tell you who they are.
"We are doing purely the story Che, the person, not the movement", said producer Sy Bartlett. "We want to show what happened with the people who touched his life."

Filming started in October in Puerto Rico. The island was chosen because South America was considered too politically unstable.

Critical reception
The film received mostly negative reviews at the time of its release. Critic Paul Brenner stated: "In this badly misconceived pseudo-biography of the legendary Cuban revolutionary—played, incredibly, by Omar Sharif—Che Guevara takes up the cause as a rebel fighter under the direction of Fidel Castro, played—also incredibly—by Jack Palance." Che! was listed in the book The Fifty Worst Films of All Time (1978). The Book of Lists (1977) labeled it "a cardboard, pseudo-historical drama" and noted that "Poor Sharif is forced to deliver lines such as 'The peasant is like a flower, and the revolutionary like a bee. Neither can survive or propagate without the other'".

Film critic Roger Ebert panned the film and the motivations for producing the drama, writing: "From the beginning, it sounded like a bad dream. Hollywood was making a movie about Che Guevara. Why? Probably because somebody smelled easy money, having been inspired by the sales figures on Che posters. That must have been the reason, because Che! is abundant evidence that no one connected with this stinkeroo gave a damn about Che Guevara, Fidel Castro, the Cuban Revolution or anything else requiring more than five seconds' thought".

Fleischer later said "the picture was a disaster. It should never have been made. People got emotional about it. By the time the memos from the board of directors got to me, they'd taken out all the pro-Che things. It took no sides, which wasn't what we started out to do. The producer was no help. He gave in so easily."

Box office
According to Fox records the film required $9,400,000 in rentals to break even and by 11 December 1970 had made $4,100,000. By September 1970 Fox estimated they had lost $3,389,000 on the film.

Soundtrack

The film score was composed, arranged and conducted by Lalo Schifrin and the soundtrack album was released on the Tetragrammaton label in 1969.

Track listing
All compositions by Lalo Schifrin except as indicated
 "Ché (Orchestra Version)" – 2:22   
 "La Columna" – 2:34   
 "Emboscada" – 3:10   
 "La Ruta" – 2:42   
 "Charangos" – 2:04   
 "Fiesta Numero Dos" - 3:06   
 "Recuerdos" – 2:44   
 "Fiesta Numero Uno" – 2:13   
 "Anita" – 2:00   
 "La Barraca" – 1:56   
 "Tiempo Pasado" – 3:00   
 "Ché (solo guitar version)" – 3:17

Personnel
 Lalo Schifrin – piano, arranger, conductor
 Marcus Cabuto, Luis Gasca – trumpet
 Ronnie Lang, Jose Lazano, Bud Shank, Sheridon Stokes, Tom Scott, Ted Nash, Justin Gordon – flute
 George del Barrio – piano, arranger
 Bob Bain, Dennis Budimer, Jose Gamboa, Al Hendrickson, Lalo Ruiz, Tommy Tedesco – guitar
 Humberto Cane, Bill Plummer – bass
 Francisco Aguabella, Larry Bunker, Julio Collazo, Orlando Lopez, Mongo Santamaría, Ken Watson – percussion
 Alfredo Ebat, Bobby Bruce, Erno Neufeld, David Frisina, Paul Shure, Marvin Limonick, Alexander Murray, George Mast, Nathan Kaproff, Bonnie Douglas, Anatol Kaminsky, Herman Clebanoff – violin
 Myra Kestenbaum, Peter Mark, Allan Harshman, Milton Thomas – viola
 Raphael Kramer, Edgar Lustgarten, Kurt Rener – cello
 Dorothy Remsen, Catherine Gotthoffer – harp
 Robert Helfer – orchestra manager
 Kaskara – voice (tracks 3, 5 & 12)

See also
 List of American films of 1969
 The Motorcycle Diaries (2004 film) directed by Walter Salles
 Che (2008 film) directed by Steven Soderbergh

References

External links
 
 
 Che! trailer at Amazon

1969 films
1960s biographical drama films
20th Century Fox films
American adventure drama films
American biographical drama films
Films about Che Guevara
Films directed by Richard Fleischer
Films set in Cuba
Films set in Bolivia
Films shot in Puerto Rico
Films shot in California
Cultural depictions of Che Guevara
Cultural depictions of Fidel Castro
1960s Spanish-language films
Films scored by Lalo Schifrin
Films with screenplays by Michael Wilson (writer)
1969 drama films
1960s English-language films
1960s American films